James H. Mather is a British supervising sound editor. He was nominated for two Academy Awards for his works on Belfast (2021) and Top Gun: Maverick (2022), winning for the latter. He was also nominated for three British Academy Film Awards for his works on Harry Potter and the Deathly Hallows – Part 2 (2011), Mission: Impossible – Fallout (2018), and Top Gun: Maverick (2022).

Selected filmography 
 Belfast (2021; co-nominated with Denise Yarde, Simon Chase and Niv Adiri)

Awards and nominations
Major associations

References

External links 

Living people
Place of birth missing (living people)
Year of birth missing (living people)
British sound editors
Best Sound Mixing Academy Award winners